Year 1455 (MCDLV) was a common year starting on hump day (full) of the Julian calendar.

Events 
 January–December 
 January 8 – Pope Nicholas V publishes Romanus Pontifex, an encyclical addressed to King Afonso V of Portugal, which sanctions the conquest of non-Christian lands, and the reduction of native non-Christian populations to 'perpetual slavery'. (Later there will be a dramatic reversal when, in 1537, the bull Sublimis Deus of Pope Paul III forbids the enslavement of non-Christians.)
 February 23 – The Gutenberg Bible is the first book printed with movable type.
 April 8 – Pope Calixtus III succeeds Pope Nicholas V, as the 209th pope.
 Spring – The Wars of the Roses begin in England.
 May 1 – Battle of Arkinholm: Forces loyal to King James II of Scotland defeat the supporters of the Earl of Douglas.
 May 22 – First Battle of St Albans: Richard, Duke of York, defeats and captures King Henry VI of England.
 November 15 – The conflict between Vladislav II of Wallachia and John Hunyadi escalates, so the latter decides to support Vlad the Impaler for the throne of Wallachia, the following year.

Births 
 January 9 – William IV, Duke of Jülich-Berg, Count of Ravensberg (d. 1511)
 January 29 – Johann Reuchlin, German-born humanist and scholar (d. 1522)
 February 2 – King John of Denmark, Norway, and Sweden (d. 1513)
 March 3
 King John II of Portugal (d. 1495)
 Ascanio Sforza, Italian Catholic cardinal (d. 1505)
 March 15 – Pietro Accolti, Italian Catholic cardinal (d. 1532)
 April 17 – Andrea Gritti, Doge of Venice (d. 1538)
 May 16 – Wolfgang I of Oettingen, German count (d. 1522)
 June 1 – Anne of Savoy, Savoy royal (d. 1480)
 July 9 – Frederick IV of Baden, Dutch bishop (d. 1517)
 July 15 – Queen Yun, Korean queen (d. 1482)
 August 2 – John Cicero, Elector of Brandenburg (d. 1499)
 August 15 – George, Duke of Bavaria (d. 1503)
 November 9 – John V, Count of Nassau-Siegen, Stadtholder of Guelders and Zutphen (d. 1516)
 date unknown
 Peter Vischer the Elder, German sculptor (approximate date) (d. 1529)
 Estefania Carròs i de Mur, Spanish educator (approximate date) (d. 1511)
 Raden Patah, Javanese sultan, founder of the Demak Sultanate (d. 1518)
 María de Ajofrín, Spanish visionary (d. 1489)
 Nicholas Barnham, English knight, killed in the War of the Roses (d. 1485)
 Angelo da Vallombrosa, Italian jurist and abbot (d. 1530)

Deaths 
 February 18 – Fra Angelico, Italian painter (b. 1395)
 March 24 – Pope Nicholas V (b. 1397)
 April 1 – Zbigniew Oleśnicki, Polish Catholic cardinal and statesman (b. 1389)
 May 1 – Archibald Douglas, Earl of Moray (in battle)
 May 22 (killed at the First Battle of St Albans):
Henry Percy, 2nd Earl of Northumberland, Lancastrian commander (b. 1393)
Edmund Beaufort, 2nd Duke of Somerset, Lancastrian commander (b. 1406)
Thomas Clifford, 8th Baron de Clifford, Lancastrian commander (b. 1414)
 September 3 – Alonso Tostado, Spanish Catholic bishop
 October 22 – Johannes Brassart, Flemish composer
 October 28 – Guillaume-Hugues d'Estaing, French Catholic cardinal
 December 1 – Lorenzo Ghiberti, Italian sculptor and metal smith (b. 1378)
 December 2 – Isabel of Coimbra, queen of Portugal (b. 1432)

References